Page Miss Glory (sometimes called Miss Glory to prevent confusion with the 1935 film of the same name) is a 1936 Warner Bros. Merrie Melodies cartoon directed by Tex Avery. The short was released on March 7, 1936. The film uses Art Deco backgrounds and character designs.

Plot 
The cartoon opens with the small town of Hicksville preparing to welcome Miss Glory. In a local hotel, teenage bellhop Abner is anxiously awaiting her arrival, and has prepared for it, but falls asleep while waiting. As he sleeps, he enters a dream sequence in which the hotel morphs into the Cosmopolitan Hotel, an upscale establishment in the big city, with Abner morphing into a fully grown bellhop at the same time. A man arrives and asks the now grown-up Abner to page Miss Glory, a guest at the hotel, and deliver a message to her. Other men arrive demanding that he page the young woman for them.

Soon, a chorus of well-dressed men begins singing "Page Miss Glory", a song that had been introduced in the feature film of the same name a year earlier. Abner joins in the singing. (In the 1930s, it was common for a cartoon short to be built around a song, with "I Love to Singa", also released in 1936, being another example). The distinct way Abner pronounces "Glory", as "Glore-EE", is loosely based on the bellhop character in the Philip Morris cigarette advertisements on radio and later television, who always called out to page "Phil-ip More-Iss" as he made his way through a hotel. That character was played by Johnny Roventini for nearly 40 years.

Abner meets someone he mistakes for Miss Glory, and he carelessly steps on the train of the woman's dress, ripping the garment off just as she crosses behind a potted plant. This woman then takes two large leaves off the same plant and begins performing a fan dance, oblivious to the fact that others are watching. Eventually, the presence of "Miss Glory" is announced over the hotel's PA system. Abner, in his rush to finally see her, is unable to get into any elevator for a while everyone else rushes, and eventually he brings back one of the elevators by turning its arrow, only for the elevator operator to then refuse to take him up. While "Miss Glory"—shown in the dream as a Harlow-type blonde—is performing in the upper floors of the hotel, Abner is trying to figure out how to work the elevator, but ends up knocked out of the building and in front of a streetcar.

The angry streetcar conductor in the big city transforms into the hotel manager in Hicksville, awakening Abner from his glamorous dream and bringing him back to reality. The manager tells Abner that Miss Glory has arrived for her stay, and the bellhop rushes out to greet the woman of his fantasies. The real Miss Glory emerges from a limousine and turns out to be a little girl, barely older than a child, causing Abner to swoon in amazement. The child then declares, "Boy, do I slay 'em!" as the cartoon irises out.

Reception
Will Friedwald writes, "Page Miss Glory marks a rare instance when the two meanings of the word 'cartoon' come into conflict — as audiences understood it in 1935-36, the term could mean an animated one-reeler screened at the movie house or the non-animated but nevertheless lively cartoons found in magazines like Esquire and The New Yorker. Miss Glory looks like the drawings of legendary 1930s New Yorker cartoonists Peter Arno or John Held Jr. come to life... Miss Glory boasts several animated dance sequences that could be described as out-Buzz-ing Berkeley; the key sequences look like someone took the sketches from the fashion designer of one of the Fred Astaire-Ginger Rogers classics and animated them."

Credits 
Produced by Leon Schlesinger. Words and music by Warren and Dubin. Moderne Art conceived and designed by Leadora Congdon.

Notes 
 Based on Page Miss Glory by Warner Bros. Pictures
 Page Miss Glory is the only Warner Bros. cartoon with all of its crew uncredited. However, rural caricatures of some of them, including Avery, Jones, Clampett and writer Melvin 'Tubby' Millar, can be seen outside the hotel at the end of the cartoon.
 The "moderne art" sequence has been much imitated in later years, for example in the title sequence for the 1990s Jeeves and Wooster television series.

Home media
 Page Miss Glory is available on Looney Tunes Golden Collection: Volume 6, Disc 4, Looney Tunes Musical Masterpieces and Looney Tunes Platinum Collection: Volume 2, Disc 2.

References

External links 
 
 Page Miss Glory on the Internet Archive

1930s color films
1936 animated films
1936 films
Merrie Melodies short films
Films directed by Tex Avery
1930s Warner Bros. animated short films
Art Deco